Slackness is a collaborative album between acoustic ska vocalist Chris Murray and the New York City ska band The Slackers. Two songs (Running From Safety, Rastaman Rock) also appear on The Slackers and Friends, as different versions. "Rastaman Rock" is renamed to "I Am a Rasta Man" on The Slackers and Friends. The track "Janie Jones" is a cover of a Clash song.

Track listing
 "Janie Jones"  – 3:21
 "Running from Safety"  – 2:46
 "The Real Ska"  – 2:06
 "Dangerous Hearts"  – 3:28
 "The World's About Me"  – 2:07
 "Rastaman Rock"  – 2:14
 "The Promise"  – 5:01
 "Home"  – 2:54
 "One Everything"  – 3:30
 "Rastaman Reggae"  – 2:31
 "Mountain of Sorrows"  – 3:34
 "Why We Go to War"  - 3:11

2005 albums
The Slackers albums
Collaborative albums